Wendy Blacklock AM (born 20 January 1932) is an Australian-born retired theatre actress and theatrical entrepreneur, radio and television actress, comedienne, producer, writer, singer, dancer and choreographer who has appeared in numerous performance roles, both locally and in the United Kingdom, and has been referred to as "The Grand Dame of the Stage".

Blacklock started her career in theatre in the early 1950s, and although she started to take small screens roles in the latter 50s, and working on screen until the late 1970s, she remained active in stage roles, her preferred genre for seven decades until the mid-2010s.

She founded the theatre company production firm Performing Lines for the Elizabethan Theatre Trust and was instrumental in establishing Aboriginal Australian theatre internationally.

However she became famous for her comic role in the TV soap opera Number 96 as Edie "Mummy"  McDonald.

Biography

Early life and drama training
Blacklock was born in 20 January 1932in Sydney, New South Wales to David Blacklock, manager of British sports company Slazenger and Lillian Ava Miller 

She was educated at the Conservetorium of Sydney and the Rathbone Academy of Dramatics Arts

Blacklock is a noted comedienne, she also toured England and worked in TV, appearing with luminaries such as Benny Hill and Bernard Bresslaw and also opposite Prunella Scales

Theatre Entrepreneur 

Blacklock, is a theatrical entrepreneur who in collaboration with the Elizabethan Theatre Trust, founded the Australian Content Department, "Performing Lines", that she ran for 21 years  toTO coach, produce and showcase new productions and artist's for the stage, and her theatre museum, features several alumni of entertainers and performers including Jill Perryman, Graham Kennedy and Gordon Chater

Number 96
Blacklock, although initially reluctant to go into a TV series, became famous for her long-running role in the 1970s television soap opera Number 96 of comedy character dizzy Edith "Edie" MacDonald, at the time the series was the highest rated drama in Australia, and she joined the series in January 1974, alongside Mike Dorsey as her regimented husband Reg McDonald, who referred to her character as "Mother" and by daughter Marilyn, played by Frances Hargreaves, who in turn referred to her as "Mummy" :
 
Edie, was a typical ditzy suburban 1970s housewife who hailed from Blacktown and had a fondness for gin, daytime soap operas and analgesics, the character became such popular and enduring comedy elements, there had been plans for a spin-off series in late 1976 based on the character's "Edie and Reg" called "Mummy and Me", the series was however not picked up by a Network, and she and Dorsey remained in Number 96, until it finished in August 1977, and she indeed spoke the final dialogue in the final episode.
 
Although the characters of Reg and Edie where enormously popular, much to the disappointment of fans, they never appeared in the feature film version 
 
Umbrella Entertainment, released several DVDs of the series, showcasing several of the more iconic storyarc's, in which Blacklock, alongside creator and screenwriter David Sale and co-stars Sheila Kennelly and Elaine Lee recorded a commentary.

Theatre career
Blacklock's acting career began on the stage and from 1951 and she is an inductee into the live performance Hall of Fame, she spent two years in England acting in repertory theatre, before returning to Australia where shes had had a solid career in the theatre which have included stage tours both locally and in New Zealand; she was also a regular cast member of the satirical revues staged at Sydney's Phillip Street Theatre in the 1960s. 

She has featured in numerous productions by such playwrights as David Williamson and Dorothy Hewett

Prior to the role in Number 96 she had played in theatrical productions of Don's Party and Who's Afraid of Virginia Woolf, and  when Spike Milligan toured Australia  she appeared opposite him in a special televised production and took the title role in Pardon Miss Westcott since the late 1970s, post-Number 96 her career has been exclusively related to theatre, including a tour of stage version of British TV series George and Mildred, she has performed as an actress and theatre company entrepreneur until retiring in 201!.

TV roles 
Although a staple of theatre, she appeared in numerous TV roles, including guest parts in police procedural series Homicide and Boney and had been a presenter on children's show Play School and had a role on Skippy the Bush Kangaroo, and during 1977 occasionally featured as a paneAllist on the game show Blankety Blanks

Roles and appearances

Screen

Theatre
Blacklock, a theatre entrepreneur, appeared in stage productions from 1954 and 2014.
Source = AusStage 
For further information: see Wendy Blacklock Theatre

Recognition, honours and awards
In 1992, Blacklock became a Member of the Order of Australia for her Service to the Arts.

The Wendy Blacklock Industry Legend Award was created and named in her honour in 2022 by PAC Australia.

Helpmann Awards
The Helpmann Awards is an awards show, celebrating live entertainment and performing arts in Australia, presented by industry group Live Performance Australia (LPA) since 2001. In 2003, Blacklock received the JC Williamson Award, the LPA's highest honour, for her life's work in live performance.

|-
| 2003 || Herself || JC Williamson Award || 
|-

References

External links
 
 

1932 births
Living people
Australian stage actresses
Australian television actresses
Helpmann Award winners
Actresses from Sydney
Members of the Order of Australia
20th-century Australian actresses
21st-century Australian women
21st-century Australian people